A Southern belle  is a stock character representing a young woman of the American South's upper socioeconomic class.

Southern Belle may also refer to:

Transportation
  Southern Belle (KCS train), a passenger train operated by the Kansas City Southern Railway
  Southern Belle, the original name of the Brighton Belle, a steam passenger train operated by the London, Brighton and South Coast Railway

Music
 "Southern Belle" (song), a song by Scotty McCreery
  "Southern Belle", a song by Elliott Smith from his 1995 album Elliott Smith

Other uses
 Southern Belle (video game), a computer game based on the eponymous LBSC steam passenger train
 The Southern Belles, a female professional wrestling tag-team from the Gorgeous Ladies of Wrestling

See also
  Southern Bell, a former operating division of BellSouth